Macho River Forest Reserve, is a protected area in Costa Rica, managed under the Central Conservation Area, it was created in 1964 by executive decree 3417.

Ramsar site  
Part of the  Ramsar site is located within this protected area and shared with Chirripó National Park, Los Quetzales National Park, Tapantí National Park, Los Santos Forest Reserve and Vueltas Hill Biological Reserve .

References 

Nature reserves in Costa Rica
Protected areas established in 1964
Ramsar sites in Costa Rica